Domestic robots can vary widely in their capabilities and tasks. Sensors include: cliff or stair sensors, motion sensors, ultrasonic object sensors, dirt sensors, IR sensors, and more. Intelligence varies also. Some have none while others can map out their environment and maneuver using complex algorithms.

See also

 Adaptable robotics
 Android
 Artificial intelligence
 Autonomous robot
 Disability robot
 Floor plans and house navigation system
 Gerontotechnology
 Home automation
 Home automation for the elderly and disabled
 Humanoid robot
 List of vacuum cleaners
 Mobile robot
 Personal Robot
 RoboSapien
 Robot kit
 Robotic arm
 Robotic mapping
 Robotics suite
 Service robot

References

 Comparison
Home automation
Technological comparisons